Master Sergeant Barbara Jean Dulinsky (1928–1995) was a member of the United States Marine Corps who, in 1967, became the first female United States Marine to serve in a combat zone, when her request to be sent to  Vietnam was granted. She served at Military Assistance Command, Vietnam (MACV) Headquarters in Saigon. She died in 1995.

References

1928 births
1995 deaths
Female United States Marine Corps personnel
United States Marines
United States Marine Corps personnel of the Vietnam War
American female military personnel of the Vietnam War
20th-century American women